Sean Michael Halton (born June 7, 1987) is an American former professional baseball first baseman. He played in Major League Baseball (MLB) for the Milwaukee Brewers.

Career
Halton attended Fresno High School and Fresno City College.  After two years at FCC, he then attended Lewis-Clark State College in Lewiston, Idaho.

Milwaukee Brewers
He was drafted by Milwaukee in the 13th round of the 2009 MLB Draft. That year, he played for the Helena Brewers of the Rookie-level Pioneer League. He played part of the 2010 season with the Wisconsin Timber Rattlers of the Class A Midwest League and then ended the season with the Brevard County Manatees of the Class A-Advanced Florida State League.

In 2011, Halton spent the entire season in the AA affiliate (Huntsville Stars).  Halton spent all of 2012 with the Nashville Sounds of the Class AAA Pacific Coast League.  After spending all of 2013 spring training with the big league club, Halton was sent to Nashville to begin the season.

Halton made his major league debut for the Brewers on June 27, 2013 against the Chicago Cubs.  In a pinch-hit at-bat, Halton singled off of Cubs pitcher Matt Garza to record his first major league hit in his first major league plate appearance.

Halton was outrighted off the Brewers roster on March 18, 2014.

Baltimore Orioles
He was drafted by the Orioles in the Triple-A phase of the 2014 Rule 5 draft. He elected free agency on November 6, 2015.

Lancaster Barnstormers
On March 9, 2016, Halton signed with the Lancaster Barnstormers of the Atlantic League of Professional Baseball.

Broncos de Reynosa
On April 1, 2016, Halton signed with the Broncos de Reynosa of the Mexican Baseball League. He was released on May 7, 2016.

Detroit Tigers
On January 3, 2017, Halton signed a minor-league contract with the Detroit Tigers. He was released in March 2017.

Second stint with Barnstormers
On April 5, 2017, Halton signed with the Lancaster Barnstormers of the Atlantic League of Professional Baseball. He became a free agent after the 2017 season.

Halton retired from professional baseball in January 2018.

See also
Rule 5 draft results

References

External links

1987 births
Living people
Baseball players from San Francisco
Major League Baseball outfielders
Milwaukee Brewers players
Fresno City Rams baseball players
Lewis–Clark State Warriors baseball players
Helena Brewers players
Arizona League Brewers players
Wisconsin Timber Rattlers players
Brevard County Manatees players
Huntsville Stars players
Navegantes del Magallanes players
American expatriate baseball players in Venezuela
Tigres del Licey players
American expatriate baseball players in the Dominican Republic
Nashville Sounds players
Bowie Baysox players
Norfolk Tides players
Lancaster Barnstormers players
Broncos de Reynosa players
Toros del Este players
Bravos de Margarita players
Mankato MoonDogs players